The Museum of Copenhagen (Danish: Københavns Bymuseum) is the official museum of Copenhagen, Denmark, documenting the city's history from the 12th century to the present.

History
The  Museum of Copenhagen was founded in 1901. Starting in 1925, the museum had a permanent exhibition in the attic of Copenhagen City Hall.

As the collections grew, the attic became too small and in 1956 the museum moved to the former building of the Royal Copenhagen Shooting Society  (Det Kongelige Kjøbenhavnske Skydeselska) in Vesterbro.  The former shooting range became a public park, still known as Skydebanehaven. 
 The buildings themselves dated to 1787 and were built based upon  drawings by  architect Johan Henrich Brandemann (1736–1803).

In 1984, the museum took over the former Maria Kruuse School in the adjacent Absalongade. It is now used for administration as well as the museum's archives. Part of the street was turned into a museum street featuring historic street furniture.

In  2010, the museum changed its name to the Copenhagen Museum. In 2018, the museum announced a planned relocation to a new location on Stormgade   in central Copenhagen.

Today
The Copenhagen Museum is owned and operated by the City of Copenhagen. It now operates in an affiliate with Thorvaldsen Museum and Kunsthallen Nikolaj as part of  an association of cultural institutions known as Historie & Kunst.

References

External links 
 Københavns Museum official website 
Historie & Kunst official website 

Museums in Copenhagen
Local museums in Metropolitan Copenhagen
City museums
Museums established in 1891
History of Copenhagen
Cultural infrastructure completed in 1787
Vesterbro, Copenhagen
History museums in Denmark
1891 establishments in Denmark